Lyasan Albertovna Utiasheva (born 28  June 1985) is a Russian TV show host, socialite, and former individual rhythmic gymnast, she was a two time Grand Prix Final all-around medalist. Utiasheva is now working as a successful businesswoman, founder of the online project «Sila Voli», one of the Ambassadors of the 2018 FIFA World Cup and a mother of two children. She was known for her extreme flexibility, her emphasis in point of landing on high releve in her back split pivots led to a career ending injury.

Career 

Utiasheva's first coach was Alla Yanina. Irina Viner invited both Utiasheva and her coach to join the Olympic Centre in Moscow, but it was only Utiasheva who moved.

Utiasheva's breakthrough came in 2001 when she placed third at the Russian Championships. She then competed at the 2001 World Cup in Berlin and won gold medals in All-around and the individual apparatus finals in clubs, ball, rope and hoop. At the 2001 World Games in Akita, Japan, Utiasheva won four silver medals behind teammate Irina Tchachina in event finals for rope, hoop, ball and clubs. Utiasheva won the all-around silver medal at the 2001 Grand Prix Final in Deventer, she also won 2 gold medals in the apparatus finals in clubs and rope. She was a member of the Russian team that won gold at the 2001 World Championships in Madrid but they were later disqualified due to Alina Kabaeva and Irina Tchachina testing positive for a banned diuretic.

In September 2002, Utiasheva hurt her foot on a bad landing while training in Samara but the X-ray revealed no fracture so she continued training and competing for the next eight months. At the 2002 Grand Prix Final in Innsbruck, Utiasheva felt pain in her feet after her ringjump and withdrew from the competition after the hoop final. At a specialist clinic in Berlin, magnetic resonance tomography showed that the navicular bone of both her feet had numerous fractures. She underwent surgery and returned to the sport briefly in 2004 but, unable to perform her jumps, she retired from competition and completed her career in 2006.

Utiasheva continued performing in galas and also began coaching. She starred in Alexei Nemov's 2007 show with other rhythmic stars including Yulia Barsukova. She was also one of the judges at the 2012, 2014,  2016, and 2017 Miss Russia pageants.

Personal life 
Lyasan Utiasheva was born to a  Bashkir mother named Zulfiya Utyasheva, and a father of mixed Russian, Polish, and Volga Tatar descent named Albert Utyashev. She converted to Orthodox Christianity from Islam. She married Russian actor and comedian Pavel Volya, with whom she has a son, Robert, born in Miami, Florida. She gave birth to a daughter, Sofiya, in Summer 2015.

Routine music information

References

External links

 Liasan Utiasheva official website 
 
 
 
 

1985 births
Living people
Bashkir people
People from Bashkortostan
Sportspeople from Bashkortostan
Russian people of Tatar descent
Russian people of Polish descent
Russian rhythmic gymnasts
Russian former Muslims
Converts to Eastern Orthodoxy from Islam
Eastern Orthodox Christians from Russia
World Games silver medalists
Competitors at the 2001 World Games
Bashkir women